Romano di Lombardia is a comune (municipality) in the Province of Bergamo in the northern Italian region of Lombardy, located about  east of Milan and about  southeast of Bergamo. It received the honorary title of city with a presidential decree on September 17, 1962.

Romano di Lombardia borders the following municipalities: Bariano, Cologno al Serio, Cortenuova, Covo, Fara Olivana con Sola, Fornovo San Giovanni, Martinengo, Morengo.

Main sights
Rocca (castle)
Palazzo della Ragione (13th century), with frescoed halls and a portico once housing the fish market, of probably Roman origins, as well as another Gothic portico dating to the 15th century and commissioned by Bartolomeo Colleoni.
Basilica of San Defendente (16th century)
Countryside church of St. Joseph, one of the most ancient in the area (known from the 9th century)
Baroque sanctuary of Madonna della Fontana

People
Giovanni Battista Rubini, tenor 
Giovan Battista Caniana, sculptor
Vittorio Seghezzi, cyclist

Transport
 Romano railway station
Highway A35 (Brebemi)

References

External links
 Official website